Lala is an underground metro station that serve Line 6 on the Naples Metro. It was opened on 4 February 2007 as part of the inaugural section of Line 6 between Mergellina and Mostra.

Is located in the Fuorigrotta neighborhood of Naples, and was designed by Uberto Siola. The station was opened along the line, on 11 January 2007 and consists of 2 binary passers-by.
Lala is a station being decorated with works of art Castella, Campigotto and Dago.

The previous station is Mergellina, the next is Augusto.

References

See also
Railway stations in Italy
List of Naples metro stations

Naples Metro stations
2007 establishments in Italy
Railway stations opened in 2007
Railway stations in Italy opened in the 21st century